Kenneth L. Roberson (born 1956 in Thomson, Georgia) is an American choreographer and dancer best known for his work on Avenue Q.

Early life and career
Roberson was born in Thomson, Georgia. He was an undergraduate at the Henry Grady School of Journalism at the University of Georgia when he saw a local dance troupe performing and resolved to become a dancer. In 1979, he graduated with a degree in journalism and got a job at the Athens Banner-Herald. He later quit his job for a chance to audition at the Alvin Ailey American Dance Theater. He attended the school for two years before joining dance-pop group Fantasy. He studied tap dancing under Henry LeTang who told him about the upcoming Paris premiere of Black and Blue. He went on to make his Broadway debut in the musical's American version in 1989. He danced in the 1990 revival of Oh, Kay! and in Jelly's Last Jam, a musical about the life of Jelly Roll Morton. In 1998 he did the musical staging for John Leguizamo's one-man play Freak. Ken also was nominated for an Emmy Award for best choreography for Mr. Lequizamo's sketch comedy series House of Buggin' for Fox TV.  This led to a job choreographing the 2000 US tour of The Civil War. He choreographed the Off-Broadway and Broadway versions of Avenue Q. In 2009 he choreographed Colman Domingo's one-man show A Boy and His Soul. Kenneth is director of ETHEL written and performed by Terry Burrell.

He is Professor of Practice, Theatre, Drama and Contemporary Dance at Indiana University.

Work

Dancer
1985 Black and Blue (European premiere)
1988 Sophisticated Ladies (European tour)
1989 Black and Blue (Broadway premiere)
1990 Oh, Kay! (1990 Broadway revival)
1992 Jelly's Last Jam

Choreographer
1996 A Brief History of White Music
1996 In Walks Ed
1998 Freak (Musical staging)
2000 The Civil War
2000 Show Boat
2000 Cinderella
2001 Guys and Dolls
2002 Harlem Song
2003 Ain't Misbehavin'
2003 Jar The Floor
2003 Avenue Q
2003 Great Joy!
2004 Drowning Crow
2005 The Color Purple (Alliance Theater world premiere)
2005 All Shook Up
2007 Ray Charles Live!
2009 A Boy and His Soul

Film and television
1995 House of Buggin' (TV)
1998 Freak
2005 Lackawanna Blues (TV)
2004 Brother to Brother
2005 Preaching to the Choir

Awards
1995 Nominated for Primetime Emmy Award for Outstanding Choreography - House of Buggin'
2003 Nominated for Lucille Lortel Award for Outstanding Choreographer - Avenue Q
2004 Nominated for Lucille Lortel Awards and Drama Desk Awards for Outstanding Choreographer - George C. Wolfe's Harlem Song
2009 Nominated for Lucille Lortel Award for Outstanding Choreographer - A Boy and His Soul

References

External links

African-American choreographers
American choreographers
1956 births
People from Thomson, Georgia
African-American male dancers
African-American dancers
American male dancers
Living people
21st-century African-American people
20th-century African-American people